The Boston University Libraries at Boston University  include the Mugar Memorial Library, the main library on the Charles River campus, and several specialized libraries.  These specialized libraries have targeted collections and services for area-specific research

The Law, Theology, and Medical Libraries, and the Howard Gotlieb Archival Research Center are separate units at BU.

The BU libraries house more than 2.4 million physical volumes, over 45,000 current unique serials, and 77,000 media titles. Students also have access to more than 35 million items due to the increased networked services through the Boston Library Consortium, the Boston Theological Institute and the New England Law Library Consortium.

The librarians provide library tutorials, library instruction from research basics to graduate-level classes, reference services, access to digital resources, specialist consultations, and librarian-created guides with curated resources.  .

References

External links
 Fineman & Pappas Law Libraries
 School of Theology Library
 Alumni Medical Library
 African Studies Library
 Michael D. Papagiannis Astronomy Library
 Frederick S. Pardee Management Library
 Music Library
 Pickering Educational Resources Library
 Science and Engineering Library 
 Stone Science Library
 Howard Gotlieb Archival Research Center

Libraries